This is a list of municipalities in Finland having standing links to local communities in other countries known as "town twinning" (usually in Europe) or "sister cities" (usually in the rest of the world). In Finnish the terms ystävyyskaupungit, ystävyyskunnat are used.

A
Ähtäri

 Audru (Pärnu), Estonia
 Dujiangyan, China
 Lycksele, Sweden

Asikkala is a member of the Douzelage, a town twinning association of towns across the European Union. Asikkala also has one other twin town.

Douzelage
 Agros, Cyprus
 Altea, Spain
 Bad Kötzting, Germany
 Bellagio, Italy
 Bundoran, Ireland
 Chojna, Poland
 Granville, France
 Holstebro, Denmark
 Houffalize, Belgium
 Judenburg, Austria
 Kőszeg, Hungary
 Marsaskala, Malta
 Meerssen, Netherlands
 Niederanven, Luxembourg
 Oxelösund, Sweden
 Preveza, Greece
 Rokiškis, Lithuania
 Rovinj, Croatia
 Sesimbra, Portugal
 Sherborne, England, United Kingdom
 Sigulda, Latvia
 Siret, Romania
 Škofja Loka, Slovenia
 Sušice, Czech Republic
 Tryavna, Bulgaria
 Türi, Estonia
 Zvolen, Slovakia
Other
 Prienai, Lithuania

E
Espoo

 Esztergom, Hungary
 Irving, United States
 Køge, Denmark
 Kongsberg, Norway
 Kristianstad, Sweden
 Nõmme (Tallinn), Estonia
 Shanghai, China
 Skagafjörður, Iceland

Eura

 Askersund, Sweden
 Harku, Estonia

Eurajoki
 Weener, Germany

F
Forssa

 Gödöllő, Hungary
 Sarpsborg, Norway
 Sault Ste. Marie, Canada
 Serpukhov, Russia
 Södertälje, Sweden
 Struer, Denmark
 Tierp, Sweden

H
Hämeenlinna

 Bærum, Norway
 Celle, Germany
 Frederiksberg, Denmark
 Hafnarfjörður, Iceland
 Lucca, Italy
 Püspökladány, Hungary
 Tartu, Estonia
 Toruń, Poland

 Uppsala, Sweden
 Weimar, Germany

Hamina

 Falun, Sweden
 Paide, Estonia
 Røros, Norway

Hankasalmi

 Häädemeeste, Estonia
 Karmøy, Norway
 Mjölby, Sweden

Hanko

 Gentofte, Denmark
 Haapsalu, Estonia
 Halmstad, Sweden
 Stord, Norway

Heinävesi
 Körmend, Hungary

Heinola

 Karlshamn, Sweden
 Peine (district), Germany
 Piešťany, Slovakia

Helsinki does not sign any formal town twinning treaties.

Huittinen

 Frederiksværk (Halsnæs), Denmark
 Hoyerswerda, Germany
 Keila, Estonia
 Odda, Norway
 Stenungsund, Sweden

Hyvinkää

 Eigersund, Norway
 Hersfeld-Rotenburg (district), Germany
 Kecskemét, Hungary

 Kunshan, China
 Motala, Sweden

I
Ii

 Bjurholm, Sweden
 Kronstadt, Russia

Iisalmi

 Guldborgsund, Denmark
 Kirishi, Russia
 Pécel, Hungary
 Võru, Estonia

Imatra

 Beihai, China
 Jiaxing, China
 Ludvika, Sweden
 Narva-Jõesuu, Estonia
 Salzgitter, Germany
 Szigetvár, Hungary
 Tikhvin, Russia
 Zvolen, Slovakia

Inari

 Handan, China
 Kola, Russia
 Nesseby, Norway
 Sør-Varanger, Norway

Ingå

 Fredensborg, Denmark
 Håbo, Sweden
 Nittedal, Norway

Isokyrö
 Vännäs, Sweden

J
Jakobstad

 Asker, Norway
 Bünde, Germany
 Eslöv, Sweden
 Garðabær, Iceland
 Jamestown, United States
 Jūrmala, Latvia
 Rudersdal, Denmark

Jämijärvi

 Geisenfeld, Germany
 Paide, Estonia

Järvenpää 

 Buchholz in der Nordheide, Germany
 Jõgeva County, Estonia
 Lørenskog, Norway
 Pasadena, United States
 Rødovre, Denmark
 Täby, Sweden
 Vác, Hungary
 Volkhov, Russia

Joensuu

 Ísafjörður, Iceland
 Hof, Germany
 Linköping, Sweden
 Petrozavodsk, Russia
 Tønsberg, Norway
 Vilnius, Lithuania

Jokioinen
 Põhja-Sakala, Estonia

Juupajoki

 Nore og Uvdal, Norway
 Surahammar, Sweden
 Wahlstedt, Germany

Jyväskylä

 Debrecen, Hungary
 Esbjerg, Denmark
 Eskilstuna, Sweden
 Fjarðabyggð, Iceland
 Mudanjiang, China
 Niiza, Japan
 Potsdam, Germany
 Poznań, Poland
 Stavanger, Norway
 Tartu Parish, Estonia
 Yaroslavl, Russia

K
Kaarina

 Enköping, Sweden
 Jõgeva, Estonia
 Sovetsky, Russia
 Szentes, Hungary

Kajaani

 Jiujiang, China
 Marquette, United States
 Nyíregyháza, Hungary
 Östersund, Sweden
 Rostov-on-Don, Russia
 Schwalm-Eder (district), Germany

Kalajoki

 Izumo, Japan
 Sosnovy Bor, Russia
 Vansbro, Sweden

Kangasala

 Eiði, Faroe Islands
 Fjallabyggð, Iceland
 Herning, Denmark
 Holmestrand, Norway
 Husby, Germany
 Jomala, Åland Islands, Finland
 Paamiut, Greenland

 Räpina, Estonia
 Vänersborg, Sweden
 Zulpich, Germany

Kannus is a member of the Charter of European Rural Communities, a town twinning association across the European Union. Kannus also has one other twin town.

Charter of European Rural Communities
 Bienvenida, Spain
 Bièvre, Belgium
 Bucine, Italy
 Cashel, Ireland
 Cissé, France
 Desborough, England, United Kingdom
 Esch (Haaren), Netherlands
 Hepstedt, Germany
 Ibănești, Romania
 Kandava (Tukums), Latvia
 Kolindros, Greece
 Lassee, Austria
 Medzev, Slovakia
 Moravče, Slovenia
 Næstved, Denmark
 Nagycenk, Hungary
 Nadur, Malta
 Ockelbo, Sweden
 Pano Lefkara, Cyprus
 Põlva, Estonia
 Samuel (Soure), Portugal
 Slivo Pole, Bulgaria
 Starý Poddvorov, Czech Republic
 Strzyżów, Poland
 Tisno, Croatia
 Troisvierges, Luxembourg
 Žagarė (Joniškis), Lithuania
Other
 Ustyuzhna, Russia

Karvia
 Viru-Nigula, Estonia

Kauhava

 Jevnaker, Norway
 Lemvig, Denmark
 Rygge, Norway
 Skærbæk (Tønder), Denmark  
 Þorlákshöfn, Iceland
 Vimmerby, Sweden

Kauniainen

 Danderyd, Sweden
 Pirita (Tallinn), Estonia

Kemi

 Liptovský Mikuláš, Slovakia
 Luleå, Sweden
 Newtownards, Northern Ireland, United Kingdom
 Székesfehérvár, Hungary
 Tromsø, Norway
 Wismar, Germany

Kemijärvi

 Kandalaksha, Russia
 Sōbetsu, Japan
 Vadsø, Norway
 Vardø, Norway

Kerava

 Aschersleben, Germany
 Arumeru, Tanzania

 Keila, Estonia
 Kristiansand, Norway
 Ogre, Latvia
 Reykjanesbær, Iceland
 Solt, Hungary
 Trollhättan, Sweden
 Vladimir, Russia

Keuruu

 Jõgeva, Estonia
 Langeland, Denmark
 Skaun, Norway
 Szarvas, Hungary
 Tingsryd, Sweden
 Uglich, Russia

Kirkkonummi

 Paldiski (Lääne-Harju), Estonia
 Sundbyberg, Sweden

Kokemäki

 Falköping, Sweden
 Lier, Norway
 Mariagerfjord, Denmark
 Põltsamaa, Estonia

Kokkola

 Averøy, Norway
 Boldog, Hungary
 Fitchburg, United States 
 Fredericia, Denmark
 Fushun, China
 Greater Sudbury, Canada
 Hatvan, Hungary
 Härnösand, Sweden 
 Järva, Estonia
 Kristiansund, Norway
 Marijampolė, Lithuania
 Mörbylånga, Sweden
 Ratingen, Germany
 Ullånger (Kramfors), Sweden

Korsholm

 Mandal, Norway
 Middelfart, Denmark
 Oskarshamn, Sweden
 Tõstamaa (Järva), Estonia
 Varbla (Lääneranna), Estonia

Kotka

 Fredrikstad, Norway
 Gdynia, Poland
 Glostrup, Denmark
 Greifswald, Germany
 Klaipėda, Lithuania
 Kronstadt, Russia
 Landskrona, Sweden
 Lübeck, Germany
 Taizhou, China
 Tallinn, Estonia

Kouvola

 Balatonfüred, Hungary
 Mülheim an der Ruhr, Germany
 Vologda, Russia

Kristinestad

 Åndalsnes (Rauma), Norway
 Rosenholm (Syddjurs), Denmark
 Sala, Sweden

Kuhmo

 Kostomuksha, Russia
 Oroszlány, Hungary
 Robertsfors, Sweden
 Šaľa, Slovakia

Kuopio

 Besançon, France
 Bodø, Norway
 Castrop-Rauxel, Germany
 Craiova, Romania
 Gera, Germany
 Győr, Hungary
 Jönköping, Sweden
 Minneapolis, United States
 Opole, Poland

 Pudong (Shanghai), China
 Svendborg, Denmark
 Winnipeg, Canada

Kustavi

 Faaborg-Midtfyn, Denmark
 Hole, Norway
 Strandabyggð, Iceland
 Tanum, Sweden

Kuusamo

 Loukhi, Russia
 Sanya, China

L
Lahti

 Akureyri, Iceland
 Ålesund, Norway
 Dolni Dabnik, Bulgaria
 Deyang, China
 Garmisch-Partenkirchen, Germany
 Narva, Estonia
 Norberg, Sweden
 Pécs, Hungary
 Randers, Denmark
 Suhl, Germany
 Tamsalu (Tapa), Estonia
 Västerås, Sweden
 Worcestershire, England, United Kingdom
 Wuxi, China
 Zaporizhia, Ukraine
 Zhangjiakou, China

Laihia

 Kil, Sweden
 Tõrva, Estonia
 Trysil, Norway

Lappeenranta

 Drammen, Norway
 Klin, Russia
 Kolding, Denmark
 Lake Worth, United States
 Örebro, Sweden
 Rakvere, Estonia
 Schwäbisch Hall, Germany
 Stykkishólmur, Iceland
 Szombathely, Hungary

Lapua

 Hagfors, Sweden
 Hohenlockstedt, Germany
 Lantana, United States
 Rakvere, Estonia
 Kiskőrös, Hungary

Laukaa

 Modum, Norway
 Östra Göinge, Sweden
 Stevns, Denmark

Lempäälä

 Castiglione del Lago, Italy
 Øvre Eiker, Norway
 Priozersky District, Russia
 Tapolca, Hungary
 Ulricehamn, Sweden
 Upplands-Bro, Sweden

Leppävirta

 Dovre, Norway
 Orissaare (Saaremaa), Estonia
 Schwerte, Germany
 Storfors, Sweden

Lieto

 Herlev, Denmark
 Höganäs, Sweden
 Komárno, Slovakia
 Komárom, Hungary
 Nesodden, Norway
 Nõva (Lääne-Nigula), Estonia
 Seltjarnarnes, Iceland

Liperi

 Aalborg, Denmark
 Büchen, Germany
 Orsa, Sweden
 Rendalen, Norway
 Saku, Estonia

Lohja

 Lidingö, Sweden
 Ringerike, Norway
 Skagaströnd, Iceland
 Växjö, Sweden

Loimaa
 

 Frogn, Norway
 Jõhvi, Estonia
 Mosfellsbær, Iceland  
 Norddjurs, Denmark
 Skien, Norway
 Staraya Russa, Russia
 Thisted, Denmark  
 Türi, Estonia
 Uddevalla, Sweden

M
Mäntsälä
 Vara, Sweden

Mänttä-Vilppula

 Bornholm, Denmark
 Høyanger, Norway
 Põltsamaa, Estonia
 Ronneby, Sweden
 Shijingshan (Beijing), China
 Simmern, Germany
 Stary Oskol, Russia

Mariehamn

 Gotland, Sweden
 Kópavogur, Iceland
 Kragerø, Norway
 Kuressaare (Saaremaa), Estonia
 Lomonosov, Russia
 Tórshavn, Faroe Islands
 Valkeakoski, Finland

Mikkeli

 Békéscsaba, Hungary
 Borås, Sweden
 Luga, Russia
 Mõisaküla, Estonia
 Molde, Norway
 Ostholstein (district), Germany
 Vejle, Denmark

Muurame

 Alatskivi (Peipsiääre), Estonia
 Vinje, Norway

Mynämäki
 Paikuse (Pärnu), Estonia

N
Naantali

 Nordfyn, Denmark
 Puck, Poland
 Svelvik, Norway
 Vadstena, Sweden

Nakkila

 Boksitogorsk, Russia
 Hudiksvall, Sweden

Närpes

 Akranes, Iceland
 Bamble, Norway
 Roshchino, Russia
 Tønder, Denmark  
 Västervik, Sweden

Nivala
 Zirc, Hungary

Nokia 

 Blönduós, Iceland
 Horsens, Denmark
 Karlstad, Sweden
 Moss, Norway

Nurmes

 Laholm, Sweden
 Ørsta, Norway
 Segezha, Russia
 Volda, Norway

Nurmijärvi

 Lilla Edet, Sweden
 Rapla, Estonia

Nykarleby

 Hammel (Favrskov), Denmark
 Sollefteå, Sweden
 Steinkjer, Norway

O
Orimattila

 Kościelisko, Poland

 Durbuy, Belgium

 Kozármisleny, Hungary
 Östhammar, Sweden
 Tvrdošín, Slovakia
 Valga, Estonia
 Valka, Latvia

Oulu

 Alta, Norway
 Arkhangelsk, Russia
 Astana, Kazakhstan
 Boden, Sweden
 Bursa, Turkey
 Halle, Germany
 Hangzhou, China
 Kronstadt, Russia
 Leverkusen, Germany
 Matera, Italy
 Odesa, Ukraine
 Siófok, Hungary
 Szigetszentmiklós, Hungary

Outokumpu

 Kohtla-Järve, Estonia
 Schöningen, Germany

P
Paimio

 Ås, Norway
 Audru (Pärnu), Estonia
 Ljungby, Sweden
 Odenthal, Germany
 Zelenogorsk, Russia

Pargas

 Chudovo, Russia
 Haninge, Sweden
 Hiiumaa, Estonia
 Ulstein, Norway

Parkano

 Monselice, Italy
 Vò, Italy

Pirkkala

 Gladsaxe, Denmark
 Ski, Norway
 Solna, Sweden
 Valjala (Saaremaa), Estonia

Pori

 Bremerhaven, Germany
 Eger, Hungary
 Kołobrzeg, Poland
 Mâcon, France
 Porsgrunn, Norway
 Riga, Latvia
 Sønderborg, Denmark
 Stralsund, Germany
 Sundsvall, Sweden

Porvoo

 Dalvíkurbyggð, Iceland
 Dinkelsbühl, Germany
 Hamar, Norway
 Hancock, United States
 Kamień Pomorski, Poland
 Lund, Sweden
 Viborg, Denmark
 Viimsi, Estonia
 Viljandi, Estonia

Pudasjärvi

 Kronstadt, Russia
 Loukhi, Russia
 Vindeln, Sweden

Pyhäjoki
 Sosnovy Bor, Russia

Pyhtää

 Haljala, Estonia
 Nacka, Sweden

R
Raahe

 Košice, Slovakia
 Märjamaa, Estonia
 Rana, Norway
 Skellefteå, Sweden

Raisio

 Csongrád, Hungary
 Elmshorn, Germany
 Kingisepp, Russia
 Padise (Lääne-Harju), Estonia
 Sigtuna, Sweden

Rauma 

 Boynton Beach, United States
 Gävle, Sweden
 Gjøvik, Norway
 Kaposvár, Hungary
 Næstved, Denmark
 Zhuhai, China

Rautalampi
 Torsby, Sweden

Riihimäki

 Aalborg, Denmark
 Bad Segeberg, Germany

 Jonava, Lithuania
 Karlskoga, Sweden
 Lillestrøm, Norway
 Norðurþing, Iceland
 Olaine, Latvia
 Real Sitio de San Ildefonso, Spain

 Szolnok, Hungary

Rovaniemi

 Ajka, Hungary
 Alanya, Turkey
 Cadillac, United States
 Grindavík, Iceland
 Harbin, China
 Kassel, Germany
 Kiruna, Sweden

 Narvik, Norway
 Neustrelitz, Germany
 Olsztyn, Poland
 Sankt Johann in Tirol, Austria
 Veszprém, Hungary

S
Saarijärvi

 Gran, Norway
 Kungsbacka, Sweden
 Trittau (Amt), Germany

Salla

 Arjeplog, Sweden
 Båtsfjord, Norway
 Kovdor, Russia
 Wildau, Germany

Salo

 Anija, Estonia
 Elva, Estonia
 Gárdony, Hungary
 Nagykanizsa, Hungary
 Odder, Denmark
 Puchheim, Germany
 Qingdao, China
 Rzhev, Russia
 St. Anthony, United States

Sastamala

 Halden, Norway
 Kashin, Russia
 Kuressaare (Saaremaa), Estonia
 Pihtla (Saaremaa), Estonia
 Ringsted, Denmark 
 Skövde, Sweden   
 Vásárosnamény, Hungary

Savonlinna

 Árborg, Iceland
 Arendal, Norway
 Budavár (Budapest), Hungary
 Detmold, Germany
 Kalmar, Sweden

 Torzhok, Russia

Seinäjoki

 Jiangjin, China
 Koszalin, Poland
 Schweinfurt, Germany
 Sopron, Hungary
 Thunder Bay, Canada

Siilinjärvi

 Elverum, Norway
 Hajdúböszörmény, Hungary
 Kamennogorsk, Russia
 Sunne, Sweden  

Sipoo

 Aurskog-Høland, Norway
 Frederikssund, Denmark
 Kumla, Sweden
 Kuusalu, Estonia

Siuntio

 Fellingsbro (Lindesberg), Sweden
 Türi, Estonia

Sodankylä

 Berlevåg, Norway
 Heiligenblut am Großglockner, Austria
 Kola, Russia
 Norsjö, Sweden
 Révfülöp, Hungary

T
Tampere

 Brașov, Romania
 Chemnitz, Germany
 Essen, Germany
 Guangzhou, China
 Kaunas, Lithuania
 Kyiv, Ukraine
 Klaksvík, Faroe Islands
 Kópavogur, Iceland
 Linz, Austria
 Łódź, Poland
 Miskolc, Hungary
 Norrköping, Sweden
 Odense, Denmark
 Olomouc, Czech Republic
 Syracuse, United States
 Tartu, Estonia
 Trondheim, Norway

Teuva

 Cieszyn, Poland
 Orust, Sweden

Toivakka
 Kambja, Estonia

Tornio

 Devizes, England, United Kingdom
 Hammerfest, Norway
 Ikast-Brande, Denmark
 Kirovsk, Russia
 Szekszárd, Hungary
 Vetlanda, Sweden

Turku

 Aarhus, Denmark
 Bergen, Norway
 Bratislava, Slovakia
 Cologne, Germany
 Constanța, Romania
 Florence, Italy
 Gdańsk, Poland
 Gothenburg, Sweden
 Rostock, Germany

 Szeged, Hungary
 Tartu, Estonia
 Varna, Bulgaria

Tuusula

 Augustów, Poland
 Celle (district), Germany
 Hvidovre, Denmark
 Oppegård, Norway
 Sollentuna, Sweden
 Vinni, Estonia

U
Utajärvi
 Muhu, Estonia

Uusikaupunki

 Antsla, Estonia
 Haderslev, Denmark
 Sandefjord, Norway
 Szentendre, Hungary
 Varberg, Sweden

V
Vaasa

 Bellingham, United States
 Harstad, Norway
 Helsingør, Denmark
 Kiel, Germany
 Malmö, Sweden
 Morogoro, Tanzania
 Pärnu, Estonia
 Schwerin, Germany
 Šumperk, Czech Republic
 Umeå, Sweden

Valkeakoski

 Gotland, Sweden
 Jelenia Góra, Poland
 Kragerø, Norway
 Mariehamn, Åland Islands, Finland
 Nanchang, China
 Sokol, Russia
 Vechelde, Germany

Vantaa

 Askim, Norway
 Frankfurt an der Oder, Germany
 Huddinge, Sweden
 Jinan, China
 Mateh Yehuda, Israel
 Mladá Boleslav, Czech Republic
 Rastatt (district), Germany
 Salgótarján, Hungary
 Słupsk, Poland

Varkaus

 Lu'an, China
 Nakskov (Lolland), Denmark
 Petrozavodsk, Russia
 Pirna, Germany
 Rjukan, Norway
 Rüsselsheim am Main, Germany
 Sandviken, Sweden
 Zalaegerszeg, Hungary

Vesilahti

 Rõuge, Estonia
 Sankt Georgen im Schwarzwald, Germany

Vihti

 Norrtälje, Sweden
 Otepää, Estonia
 Sel, Norway
 Slagelse, Denmark

Vörå

 Ånge, Sweden
 Gausdal, Norway
 Malvik, Norway
 Mora, Sweden
 Torma (Jõgeva), Estonia
 Vejen, Denmark

Y
Ylivieska
 Voss, Norway

Ylöjärvi

 Arvika, Sweden  
 Balatonföldvár, Hungary
 Kareda (Järva), Estonia
 Kongsvinger, Norway
 Saare (Jõgeva), Estonia
 Saku, Estonia
 Skive, Denmark 

Ypäjä
 Bábolna, Hungary

References

Finland
Lists of populated places in Finland
Cities and towns in Finland
Foreign relations of Finland